The arrondissement of Colmar-Ribeauvillé is an arrondissement of France in the Haut-Rhin department in the Grand Est region. It has 98 communes.

Composition

The communes of the arrondissement of Colmar-Ribeauvillé are:

Algolsheim
Ammerschwihr
Andolsheim
Appenwihr
Artzenheim
Aubure
Balgau
Baltzenheim
Beblenheim
Bennwihr
Bergheim
Biesheim
Bischwihr
Blodelsheim
Le Bonhomme
Breitenbach-Haut-Rhin
Colmar
Dessenheim
Durrenentzen
Eguisheim
Eschbach-au-Val
Fessenheim
Fortschwihr
Fréland
Geiswasser
Griesbach-au-Val
Grussenheim
Guémar
Gunsbach
Heiteren
Herrlisheim-près-Colmar
Hettenschlag
Hirtzfelden
Hohrod
Horbourg-Wihr
Houssen
Hunawihr
Husseren-les-Châteaux
Illhaeusern
Ingersheim
Jebsheim
Katzenthal
Kaysersberg Vignoble
Kunheim
Labaroche
Lapoutroie
Lièpvre
Logelheim
Luttenbach-près-Munster
Metzeral
Mittelwihr
Mittlach
Muhlbach-sur-Munster
Munchhouse
Munster
Muntzenheim
Nambsheim
Neuf-Brisach
Niedermorschwihr
Obermorschwihr
Obersaasheim
Orbey
Ostheim
Porte-du-Ried
Ribeauvillé
Riquewihr
Rodern
Roggenhouse
Rombach-le-Franc
Rorschwihr
Rumersheim-le-Haut
Rustenhart
Sainte-Croix-aux-Mines
Sainte-Croix-en-Plaine
Sainte-Marie-aux-Mines
Saint-Hippolyte
Sondernach
Soultzbach-les-Bains
Soultzeren
Stosswihr
Sundhoffen
Thannenkirch
Turckheim
Urschenheim
Vœgtlinshoffen
Vogelgrun
Volgelsheim
Walbach
Wasserbourg
Weckolsheim
Wettolsheim
Wickerschwihr
Widensolen
Wihr-au-Val
Wintzenheim
Wolfgantzen
Zellenberg
Zimmerbach

History

The arrondissement of Colmar-Ribeauvillé was created in January 2015 by the merger of the former arrondissements of Colmar and Ribeauvillé. In January 2017 seven communes from the arrondissement of Thann-Guebwiller joined the arrondissement of Colmar-Ribeauvillé.

References

Colmar-Ribeauville